CEMFI (English: Center for Monetary and Financial Studies) is an institution devoted to teaching and research in Economics. It was started in 1987, becoming the foundation of the Bank of Spain in 1991. It is located in Madrid.

It runs two graduate programs, a Master in Economics and Finance and a PhD in Economics. Both are taught in English. The official degrees are granted by Menéndez Pelayo International University.

CEMFI also offers a Summer School for practitioners and young university professors and an Undergraduate Summer Internships program to provide outstanding undergraduate students with the opportunity to gain valuable work experience in economic research and data analysis.

Tenured faculty
, PhD London School of Economics, Director of CEMFI
Dante Amengual, PhD Princeton University
Manuel Arellano, PhD London School of Economics, Director of CEMFI PhD program
Samuel Bentolila, PhD MIT
Paula Bustos, PhD Harvard University
Guillermo Caruana, PhD Boston University
Susanna Esteban, PhD University of Rochester
Gerard Llobet, PhD University of Rochester
Monica Martinez-Bravo, PhD MIT
Pedro Mira, PhD University of Minnesota
Nezih Guner, PhD University of Rochester
Josep Pijoan-Mas, PhD University College London
Diego Puga, PhD London School of Economics
Enrique Sentana, PhD London School of Economics
Javier Suarez, PhD London School of Economics

Non-tenured faculty
Dmitry Arkhangelsky, PhD Stanford GSB
Sebastián Fanelli, PhD MIT

External links
CEMFI website
UIMP website

Notes

Universities in the Community of Madrid
Organisations based in Madrid